is a Japanese sprinter who specialises in the  100 metres and 200 metres.

Achievements

References
 

1987 births
Living people
Japanese male sprinters
Competitors at the 2009 Summer Universiade
21st-century Japanese people